Local elections of 1981 to the Isle of Wight County Council, a county council in south east England, were held on 7 May 1981. The whole council was up for election, with boundary changes since the last election in 1977, which increasing the number of seats by one. The election resulted in a council with Liberal members holding more than half of the seats.

Election result

This result had the following consequences for the total number of seats on the Council after the elections:

Ward results

Arreton & Newchurch

Ashey

Bembridge

Binstead

Brading

Brighstone & Shorwell

Calbourne Shalfleet & Yarmouth

Carisbrooke East

Carisbrooke West

Chale & Niton

Cowes Castle

Cowes Central

Cowes Medina

East Cowes

Fairlee

Freshwater Afton

Freshwater Norton

Gatcombe & Godshill

Gurnard

Mount Joy

Nettlestone & St. Helens

Newport Central

Northwood

Osborne

Pan

Parkhurst

Ryde North East

Ryde North West

Ryde South East

Ryde South West

Sandown Lake

Sandown North

Sandown South

Seaview & Appley

Shanklin Central

Shanklin North

Shanklin South

St. Lawrence & Lowther

St. Johns

Totland

Ventnor Central

Wootton

Wroxall & Bonchurch

See also

 Politics of the Isle of Wight
 Isle of Wight Council elections

References

1981
1981 English local elections
20th century on the Isle of Wight